DNA is the eighth studio album by German singer Jeanette Biedermann. Her first solo album in a decade, and her first album to be performed in German, it was released by Columbia Records on 20 September 2019, selling more than 25,000 copies in Germany, Austria and Switzerland.

Track listing

Charts

References

2019 albums
German-language albums
Jeanette Biedermann albums